Cardozo is a Portuguese and Spanish surname. It is an archaic spelling of the surname "Cardoso".

Notable people with this surname
Aaron Cardozo (1762–1834), Gibraltarian consul for Tunis and Algiers
Albert Cardozo (1828–1885), United States jurist in New York
Benjamin N. Cardozo (1870–1938), United States jurist and Supreme Court justice
David de Jahacob Lopez Cardozo (1808–1890), Dutch Talmudist 
Derlis Cardozo (born 1981), Paraguayan footballer
Efraím Cardozo (1906–1973), Paraguayan politician and historian
Eleanor Cardozo (born 1965), British artist
Francis Lewis Cardozo (1836–1903), Christian clergyman, politician, and educator, first African American to hold a statewide office in the United States
Frederick Cardozo (1916–2011), British Army officer
Fulganco Cardozo (born 1988), Indian footballer 
Harold Cardozo (1888–1963), English journalist, soldier, and author 
Horacio Cardozo (born 1979), Argentine footballer
Ian Cardozo (born 1937), Indian Army officer
José Cardozo (born 1971), Paraguayan footballer
José Eduardo Cardozo (born 1959), Brazilian lawyer and former Attorney General of Brazil
Julián Cardozo (born 1991), Argentine footballer
Michael A. Cardozo (born 1941), American lawyer
Nate Cardozo, American privacy and civil rights lawyer
Neri Cardozo (born 1986), Argentine footballer
Óscar Cardozo (born 1983), Paraguayan footballer

See also
Cardoza, related name
Cardozo (disambiguation) 

Sephardic surnames